"Live to Rise" is a song recorded by American rock band Soundgarden for the 2012 film The Avengers. The song was released by Hollywood Records on April 17, 2012, as a free digital download during its first week of availability at the iTunes Store, and was later included on the film's soundtrack album, Avengers Assemble: Music from and Inspired by the Motion Picture, released on May 1, 2012.

"Live to Rise" was the first Soundgarden song to be both fully recorded and released since the band reformed in 2010, as "Black Rain" was partly recorded in the early 1990s. The single has been described as a "riff-heavy rocker" that, according to singer Chris Cornell, would "work just fine" on the band's then-upcoming album King Animal, even though it did not necessarily represent the entire album's sound. Despite earlier speculation, "Live to Rise" did not appear on King Animal.

Charts

Weekly charts

Year-end charts

Reception 
USA Todays review of the Avengers Assemble soundtrack declares "Live to Rise" "is The Incredible Hulk on this all-star soundtrack for the all-star superhero movie The Avengers."

References 

Avengers (film series)
Soundgarden songs
Songs written for films
2012 singles
Hollywood Records singles
Music videos directed by Robert Hales
Avengers (comics) in other media
Songs written by Chris Cornell
2012 songs
Marvel Cinematic Universe songs